Tan-Badan is a 1986 Bollywood film starring Govinda and Khushbu.  Although Love 86 and Ilzaam released before this film, this movie is Govinda's debut, directed by his maternal uncle (and his wife's brother-in-law) Anand Singh.

Cast

Govinda... Ravi Pratap
Khushbu... Gauri 
Iftekhar...Ravi Dad/Diwan Devendra Pratap
Satyen Kappu...Rahim Chacha
Viju Khote... Road rowdy goon
Sharat Saxena...Janga
Raj Mehra...Thakur Shamsher Singh
Leela Mishra...Mausi/Dadi
Vijay Kashyap...Doctor
Guddi Maruti.... Doctor's wife
Ram Sethi...Dinu, Driver

Songs
The music was composed by Anand–Milind. This was their first film with actor Govinda. The duo went on to do around 19 films with the actor,  most of which were chartbusters.

"Lage Na Mora Jiya, Gale Lag Jaa" - Anuradha Paudwal, Suresh Wadkar
"Biwi Hasband Ko Pyar Na Kare" - Suresh Wadkar, Alka Yagnik
"Kisi Ko Mai Aisi Lagti Hu" - Alka Yagnik
"Krishna Krishna" - Udit Narayan
"Mai Bhi Jawan Hu, Tu Bhi Jawan Hai" - Sharon Prabhakar

References

External links 
 

1980s Hindi-language films
1986 films
Films scored by Anand–Milind